Cast in Steel is the tenth studio album by Norwegian band A-ha. The album was released on 4 September 2015 by We Love Music and Polydor. It is their first studio album since Foot of the Mountain (2009), following their second reunion in early 2015.

Cast in Steel is the first a-ha album to use the original band logo since Memorial Beach from 1993, and the first album to be produced by Alan Tarney since Stay on These Roads (1988).

Background and recording
Following the release of their ninth studio album, Foot of the Mountain, a-ha announced that they would retire as a band. In 2015, however, the band announced that they would re-unite for a two-year period and release Cast in Steel, followed by a world tour to promote the album. Cast in Steel was released on 4 September 2015, shortly before a-ha performed in Brazil at Rock in Rio on 27 September for the festival's 30th anniversary.

Initially Pål Waaktaar-Savoy and Morten Harket began recording the album in New York without Magne Furuholmen. Waaktaar-Savoy said of the process: "It began quite small with Morten dropping by my studio now and then, and I played some of my new songs for him. Then he recorded his vocals on the songs he liked and the rest we didn't use. That continued until we had ten to twelve songs." He also revealed that the three members of a-ha were never present in the same studio during the recording of the album, and said: "It often ends up like this, and many bands do it this way. But I do miss the feeling of us being in the same studio, working on the same song in real time."

Furuholmen has said the reunion wasn't his decision: "The other two wanted to do it, and I had to decide: do I block it, let them do it without me, or make a fool of myself, with my statements about this being the end."

Singles
"Under the Makeup" was released as the album's first single internationally on 3 July 2015. The music video was shot in Telemark in Norway and stars Danish actress Sofie Gråbøl and Swedish actress Frida Farrell.

On 19 August 2015, "The Wake" was premiered on BBC Radio 2. The song was released as the album's second single in the United Kingdom on 28 August 2015.

A-ha performed the album's third single "Forest Fire" on 3 September 2015 at the 2015 Radiopreis-Gala in Germany. On 15 September 2015 a lyric video was released on YouTube. "Forest Fire" was added to the BBC Radio 2 playlist on 28 October 2015 as the third single from the album in the UK.

The Steve Osborne remix of "Cast in Steel" was released as an international single on 12 February 2016. On the same date, the Osborne remix of "Objects In The Mirror" was released as the fourth single in the UK.

Commercial performance
Cast in Steel debuted at number eight on the UK Albums Chart, selling 7,828 copies in its first week. It is a-ha's sixth Top 10 album in the United Kingdom. The album debuted at number four on the German Albums Chart, and became the 99th best-selling album of 2015.

Track listing

Vinyl edition
Side A
 Cast in Steel - 3:50
 Under the Makeup - 3:25
 The Wake - 3:45
 Forest Fire - 3:54
 Objects in the Mirror - 4:14
Side B
 Door Ajar - 3:46
 Living at the End of the World - 4:06
 Mythomania - 3:49
 Shadow Endeavors - 4:21
 Goodbye Thompson - 3:34

Notes
 signifies a vocal producer
 signifies pre-production

Personnel

a-ha 
 Morten Harket – vocals
 Magne Furuholmen – keyboards, vocals 
 Pål Waaktaar-Savoy – guitars, vocals 

Additional musicians
  – programming (1, 4, 5, 8, 9, 13)
 Chuck Zwicky – programming (1, 6, 10, 12)
 Rob Schwimmer – Theremin (2)
 Peter Kvint – programming (3, 7), guitars (3, 7), bass (3, 7)
 Steve Osborne – keyboards (4), programming (4), guitars (4), bass (4)
 Florian Reutter – programming (4)
 Alan Tarney – keyboards (6, 10, 12), guitars (6, 10, 12), additional backing vocals (6, 10, 12)
 Eliot Leigh – programming (6, 10, 12)
 Kurt Uenala – programming (6, 10, 12)
 Even Ormestad – bass (1, 2, 9)
 Karl Oluf Wennerberg – drums (1, 2, 4, 5, 8, 9, 11, 13)
  – drums (7)
 Joe Mardin – drums (12)
 Macedonian Radio Symphony Orchestra – orchestra (1, 2)
 Lars Horntveth – orchestral arrangement (1, 2)
 Bylund Strings – strings (7)
 Mattias Bylund – string arrangements (7)
 Sarighani Reist – cello (5, 11)
 Julie Tanner – cello (5, 11)
 Monisa Angell – viola (5, 11)
 Kristin Wilkinson – viola (5, 11)
 David Angell – violin (5, 11)
 David Davidson – violin (5, 11), string arrangements (5, 11)
 Conni Ellisor – violin (5, 11)
 Mary Kathryn Vanosdale – violin (5, 11)

Technical and Design
 Kai Andersen – recording
 John Brant – recording
 Janne Hansson – recording 
 Dag Erik Johansen – recording 
 Peter Kvint – recording, mixing (3)
 Eliot Leigh – recording 
 Erik Ljunggren – recording 
 Even Enersen Omnestad – recording 
 Steve Osborne – recording
 Max Ross – recording
 Bobby Shin – recording
 George Tanderø – recording 
 Chuck Zwicky – recording 
 Cenzo Townshend – mixing (1, 8, 9, 11)
 John O'Mahony – mixing (2)
 Simon Nordberg –  mixing (3, 7)
 Maret Pompetzki – mixing (4, 5)
 Ren Swan – mixing (6, 10, 12)
 John Davis – mastering at Metropolis Mastering (London, UK)
 Jeri Heiden – art direction, design 
 Glen Nakasako – art direction, design
 Just Loomis – photography 
 Lars Gundersen – photography 
 Harald Wiik – management

Charts

Weekly charts

Year-end charts

References

External links
 Press Release
 A-ha performing Forest Fire on Radiopreis Awards Germany
 New single Forest Fire by A-ha released in DEU
 a-ha - Cast In Steel

2015 albums
A-ha albums
Polydor Records albums
Universal Music Group albums
Albums produced by Alan Tarney